Capillin is a naturally occurring organic compound with the chemical formula . The structure contains acetophenone and a polyyne (pentadiynyl) portion, conjugated together as an ynone.

Chemical taxonomy
Capillin is found in the essential oil of a number of Artemisia species, including Artemisia monosperma and Artemisia dracunculus (tarragon). The substance was initially isolated from Artemisia capillaris in 1956.

Applications
Capillin is a biologically active substance. It has strong antifungal activity, and it is possibly antitumoral. Capillin exhibits cytotoxic activity and could cause apoptosis of certain human tumor cells.

References

Aromatic ketones
Alkyne derivatives